1992 World Cup final may refer to:

 1992 Cricket World Cup Final
 1992 Rugby League World Cup Final